Sindh was separated from the Bombay Presidency on 1 April 1936, under Government of India Act, 1935. Province of Sindh , formally knows as Sind in British India, was officially inaugurate, Sir Lancelot Graham was appointed first Governor General of the newly created province by the British Government.

Elections 

First elections of the Legislative assembly of Sindh were held on 7 February 1937 with 60 seats allocated to the newly established assembly. On the of 15 April 1937, H.E. the Governor Sir Lancelot Graham, issued a notification  to summon the first session of the first Sindh Legislative Assembly to meet on Tuesday the 27th April, 1937 at 11.00 a.m. in the Assembly Hall of the Sindh Chief Court Karachi pursuant to Section 62(3) of the Government of India Act, 1935.

List of Members of the Assembly 
Complete list of members of the first provincial assembly of Sindh, 1937 - 1945.

See also 
 Pakistan
 British India
 Sindh
 Provincial Assembly of Sindh
 Pakistan Movement
 Fourteen Points of Jinnah
 List of members of the 2nd Provincial Assembly of Sindh

References 

Sindh MPAs 1937–1945
Provincial Assembly of Sindh